Metropolitan Arsenius (secular name Alexander Ioannovich Matsieyevich, ; 1697, Volodymyr – 28 February 1772, Reval) was bishop of the Russian Orthodox Church, metropolitan of Rostov and Yaroslavl who protested against the  confiscation of the church's land by Empress Catherine II in 1764. He was deprived of his office and was imprisoned in a fortress until his death.

He was canonized in 2000.

References
Arseny Matseyevich 
George Vernadsky. A History of Russia. (Yale University Press, 1969).

1697 births
1772 deaths
People from Volodymyr-Volynskyi
Russian saints of the Eastern Orthodox Church
Bishops of the Russian Orthodox Church
18th-century Christian saints